Whim W'Him, Seattle Contemporary Dance is a Seattle-based contemporary dance company founded by Olivier Wevers in January 2009.

Programs 
Whim W'Him offers 3 productions each season.

The company has performed original works by Danielle Agami, Juanjo Arques, Andrew Bartee, Adam Barruch, Banning Bouldin, Austin Diaz, Jonathan Campbell, Lauren Edson, James Gregg, Mark Haim, Joseph Hernandez, Larry Keigwin, Maurya Kerr, Gabrielle Lamb, Loni Landon, MADBOOTS, Annabelle Lopez Ochoa, Joshua Peugh, Ihsan Rustem, Penny Saunders, Pascal Touzeau, Manuel Vignoulle, Kate Wallich, Dominic Walsh and Olivier Wevers.

References 

Encore, Seattle, November 2010
Seattle Weekly, January 2010
Financial Times, January 2010
Seattle Times, January 2010
City Arts Magazine, January 2010
The Sunbreak, January 2010
Art Dish, January 2010
Seattlest, January 2010
Subterfuge Seattle, January 2010

Dance companies in the United States
Culture of Seattle
Organizations established in 2009